Joan Neville (died 1660) was an English woman who was executed for witchcraft.

She was accused of having bewitched the nobleman Sir Orlando Bridgeman and to have caused his death by use of magic.

She was executed by hanging in Kingston-upon-Thames 3 September 1660. Her trial belonged to the last witch trials in England to have resulted in an execution, since witch trials gradually became fewer after the restoration of 1660.

See also
 Joan Peterson
 Jane Dodson

References

17th-century English people
Witch trials in England
People executed for witchcraft
1660 deaths
17th-century executions by England